Parliamentary elections were held in Mayotte on 21 March and 28 March 2004. The Mahoran branch of the Union for a Popular Movement won the most seats despite receiving fewer votes than the Mahoré Departementalist Movement.

Results

References

2004 in Mayotte
Elections in Mayotte
Mayotte
March 2004 events in Africa
Election and referendum articles with incomplete results